Leipzig I is an electoral constituency (German: Wahlkreis) represented in the Bundestag. It elects one member via first-past-the-post voting. Under the current constituency numbering system, it is designated as constituency 152. It is located in northwestern Saxony, comprising the northern part of the city of Leipzig.

Leipzig I was created for the inaugural 1990 federal election after German reunification. Since 2017, it has been represented by Jens Lehmann of the Christian Democratic Union (CDU).

Geography
Leipzig I is located in northwestern Saxony. As of the 2021 federal election, it comprises the city districts (Stadtbezirke) of Alt-West, Nord, Nordost, Nordwest, and Ost from the independent city of Leipzig.

History
Leipzig I was created after German reunification in 1990. In the 1990 through 1998 elections, it was constituency 309 in the numbering system. From 2002 through 2009, it was number 153. Since 2013, it has been number 152.

Originally, the constituency comprised the Stadtbezirke of Mitte, Nord, Nord-Ost, and West from the independent city of Leipzig. It acquired its current borders in the 2002 election.

Members
The constituency was first represented by Hermann Pohler of the Christian Democratic Union (CDU) from 1990 to 1998. It was won by Rainer Fornahl of the Social Democratic Party (SPD) in 1998 and served until 2009, when it was won Bettina Kudla of the CDU. Jens Lehmann of the CDU was elected in 2017 and re-elected in 2021.

Election results

2021 election

2017 election

2013 election

2009 election

References

Federal electoral districts in Saxony
1990 establishments in Germany
Constituencies established in 1990
Leipzig